Grandvaux railway station is a railway station in the municipality of Bourg-en-Lavaux, in the Swiss canton of Vaud. It is an intermediate stop on the standard gauge Lausanne–Bern line of Swiss Federal Railways.

Services 
 the following services stop at Grandvaux:

References

External links 
 
 

Railway stations in the canton of Vaud
Swiss Federal Railways stations